The following elections occurred in the year 1975.

Africa
 1975 Cameroonian presidential election
 1975 Cape Verdean parliamentary election
 1975 Ivorian general election
 1975 Liberian general election
 1975 São Tomé and Príncipe legislative election
 1975 Tanzanian general election
 1975 Zairean parliamentary election

Asia
 1975 Iranian legislative election
 1975 Kuwaiti general election
 1975 Philippine Kabataang Barangay election
 1975 Philippine Sangguniang Bayan elections
 1975 Republic of China legislative election
 1975 Thai general election

Australia
 1975 Australian federal election
 1975 Bass by-election
 1975 South Australian state election
 1975 Western Australian daylight saving referendum

Europe
 1975 Austrian legislative election
 1975 Danish parliamentary election
 1975 Finnish parliamentary election
 Germany: 
 1975 Rhineland-Palatinate state election 
 Wahl zum Abgeordnetenhaus von Berlin 
 Landtagswahl in Rheinland-Pfalz 
 Landtagswahl in Schleswig-Holstein 
 Landtagswahl im Saarland 
 Bürgerschaftswahl in Bremen
 1975 Liechtenstein referendums 
 1975 Northern Cyprus constitutional referendum 
 1975 Norwegian local elections
 1975 Portuguese Constituent Assembly election
 1975 United Kingdom European Communities membership referendum 
 1975 Swiss referendums 
 1975 Venetian regional election

North America

Canada
 1975 Alberta general election
 1975 British Columbia general election
 1975 New Democratic Party leadership election
 1975 Newfoundland general election
 1975 Northwest Territories general election
 1975 Ontario general election
 1975 Saskatchewan general election

United States
 1975 United States gubernatorial elections

United States gubernatorial
 1975 Louisiana gubernatorial election
 1975 United States gubernatorial elections

Louisiana
 1975 Louisiana gubernatorial election

Oceania
 1975 New Zealand general election

Australia
 1975 Australian federal election
 1975 Bass by-election
 1975 South Australian state election
 1975 Western Australian daylight saving referendum

See also

 
1975
Elections